Tooken can refer to:
 The original working title of the sitcom Unbreakable Kimmy Schmidt
 Tooken (film), a 2015 film directed by John Asher